The Mystery of 13 is a 1919 American drama film serial directed by Francis Ford.

Cast
 Francis Ford as Phil Kelly / Jim Kelly
 Rosemary Theby as Marian Green
 Peter Gerald as Hugo Madiz (as Pete Gerald)
 Mark Fenton as John Green
 Ruth Maurice as Mary Hardon
 Dorris Dare as Rose
 Nigel De Brulier as Raoul Ferrar
 Elsie Van Name as Edith
 Olive Valerie as Ralph (as Valeria Olivo)
 Philip Ford as Butts (as Phil Ford)
 Jack Saville
 Jack Lawton
 V. Orilo

See also
 List of film serials
 List of film serials by studio

References

External links

1919 films
American silent serial films
1919 drama films
American black-and-white films
Films directed by Francis Ford
Silent American drama films
1910s American films